Chivalry, or the chivalric code, is an informal and varying code of conduct developed in Europe between 1170 and 1220. It was associated with the medieval Christian institution of knighthood; knights' and gentlemen's behaviours were governed by chivalrous social codes. The ideals of chivalry were popularized in medieval literature, particularly the literary cycles known as the Matter of France, relating to the legendary companions of Charlemagne and his men-at-arms, the paladins, and the Matter of Britain, informed by Geoffrey of Monmouth's Historia Regum Britanniae, written in the 1130s, which popularized the legend of King Arthur and his knights of the Round Table. All of these were taken as historically accurate until the beginnings of modern scholarship in the 19th century.

The code of chivalry that developed in medieval Europe had its roots in earlier centuries. It arose in the Carolingian Empire from the idealisation of the cavalryman—involving military bravery, individual training, and service to others—especially in Francia, among horse soldiers in Charlemagne's cavalry. The term "chivalry" derives from the Old French term chevalerie, which can be translated as "horse soldiery". Originally, the term referred only to horse-mounted men, from the French word for horse, cheval, but later it became associated with knightly ideals.

Over time, its meaning in Europe has been refined to emphasize more general social and moral virtues. The code of chivalry, as it stood by the Late Middle Ages, was a moral system which combined a warrior ethos, knightly piety, and courtly manners, all combining to establish a notion of honour and nobility.

Terminology and definitions

The French word  originally meant "a man of aristocratic standing, and probably of noble ancestry, who is capable, if called upon, of equipping himself with a war horse and the arms of heavy cavalryman and who has been through certain rituals that make him what he is". Therefore, during the Middle Ages, the plural chevalerie (transformed in English into the word "chivalry") originally denoted the body of heavy cavalry upon formation in the field. In English, the term appears from 1292 (note that cavalry is from the Italian form of the same word).

The meaning of the term evolved over time into a broader sense, because in the Middle Ages the meaning of chevalier changed from the original concrete military meaning "status or fee associated with a military follower owning a war horse" or "a group of mounted knights" to the ideal of the Christian warrior ethos propagated in the romance genre, which was becoming popular during the 12th century, and the ideal of courtly love propagated in the contemporary Minnesang and related genres.

The ideas of chivalry are summarized in three medieval works: the anonymous poem Ordene de chevalerie, which tells the story of how Hugh II of Tiberias was captured and released upon his agreement to show Saladin (1138–1193) the ritual of Christian knighthood; the Libre del ordre de cavayleria, written by Ramon Llull (1232–1315), from Majorca, whose subject is knighthood; and the Livre de Chevalerie of Geoffroi de Charny (1300–1356), which examines the qualities of knighthood, emphasizing prowess. None of the authors of these three texts knew the other two texts, and the three combine to depict a general concept of chivalry which is not precisely in harmony with any of them. To different degrees and with different details, they speak of chivalry as a way of life in which the military, the nobility, and religion combine.

The "code of chivalry" is thus a product of the Late Middle Ages, evolving after the end of the crusades partly from an idealization of the historical knights fighting in the Holy Land and from ideals of courtly love.

10 Commandments of Chivalry
Historian Léon Gautier compiled the medieval Ten Commandments of chivalry in 1891:

 Thou shalt believe all that the Church teaches and thou shalt observe all its directions.
 Thou shalt defend the Church.
 Thou shalt respect all weaknesses, and shalt constitute thyself the defender of them.
 Thou shalt love the country in which thou wast born.
 Thou shalt not recoil before thine enemy.
 Thou shalt make war against the infidel without cessation and without mercy.
 Thou shalt perform scrupulously thy feudal duties, if they be not contrary to the laws of God.
 Thou shalt never lie, and shalt remain faithful to thy pledged word.
 Thou shalt be generous, and give largesse to everyone.
 Thou shalt be everywhere and always the champion of the Right and the Good against Injustice and Evil.

Literary chivalry and historical reality
Supporters of chivalry have assumed since the late medieval period that there was a time in the past when chivalry was a living institution, when men acted chivalrically, when chivalry was alive and not dead, the imitation of which period would much improve the present.

With the birth of modern historical and literary research, scholars have found that however far back in time "The Age of Chivalry" is searched for, it is always further in the past, even back to the Roman Empire. From Jean Charles Léonard de Sismondi:

We must not confound chivalry with the feudal system. The feudal system may be called the real life of the period of which we are treating, possessing its advantages and inconveniences, its virtues and its vices. Chivalry, on the contrary, is the ideal world, such as it existed in the imaginations of the romance writers. Its essential character is devotion to woman and to honour.

Sismondi alludes to the fictitious Arthurian romances about the imaginary Court of King Arthur when taken as factual presentations of a historical age of chivalry. He continues:

The more closely we look into history, the more clearly shall we perceive that the system of chivalry is an invention almost entirely poetical. It is impossible to distinguish the countries in which it is said to have prevailed. It is always represented as distant from us both in time and place, and whilst the contemporary historians give us a clear, detailed, and complete account of the vices of the court and the great, of the ferocity or corruption of the nobles, and of the servility of the people, we are astonished to find the poets, after a long lapse of time, adorning the very same ages with the most splendid fictions of grace, virtue, and loyalty. The romance writers of the twelfth century placed the age of chivalry in the time of Charlemagne. The period when these writers existed, is the time pointed out by Francis I. At the present day [about 1810], we imagine we can still see chivalry flourishing in the persons of Du Guesclin and Bayard, under Charles V and Francis I. But when we come to examine either the one period or the other, although we find in each some heroic spirits, we are forced to confess that it is necessary to antedate the age of chivalry, at least three or four centuries before any period of authentic history.

History

Historian of chivalry Richard W. Kaeuper saw chivalry as a central focus in the study of the European Middle Ages that was too often presented as a civilizing and stabilizing influence in the turbulent Middle Ages. On the contrary, Kaueper argues "that in the problem of public order the knights themselves played an ambivalent, problematic role and that the guides to their conduct that chivalry provided were in themselves complex and problematic." Many of the codes and ideals of chivalry were of course contradictory: when knights did live up to them, they did not lead to a more "ordered and peaceful society". The tripartite conception of medieval European society (those who pray, those who fight, and those who work) along with other linked subcategories of monarchy and aristocracy, worked in congruence with knighthood to reform the institution in an effort "to secure public order in a society just coming into its mature formation." 

Kaeuper makes clear that knighthood and the worldview of "those who fight" was pre-Christian in many ways and outside the purview of the church, at least initially. The church saw it as a duty to reform and guide knights in a way that weathered the disorderly, martial, and chauvinistic elements of chivalry. Royalty was a similar story, with knighthood at many points clashing with the sovereignty of the king over the conduct of warfare and personal disputes between knights and other knights (and even between knights and aristocracy). While the worldview of "those who work" (the burgeoning merchant class and bourgeoisie) was still in incubation, Kaeuper states that the social and economic class that would end up defining modernity was fundamentally at odds with knights, and those with chivalrous valor saw the values of commerce as beneath them. Those who engaged in commerce and derived their value system from it could be confronted with violence by knights, if need be.

According to Welsh historian David Crouch, many early writers on medieval chivalry cannot be trusted as accurate sources, because they sometimes have "polemical purpose which colours their prose". As for Kenelm Henry Digby and Léon Gautier, chivalry was a means to transform their corrupt and secular worlds. Gautier also emphasized that chivalry originated from the Teutonic forests and was brought up into civilization by the Catholic Church. Charles Mills used chivalry "to demonstrate that the Regency gentleman was the ethical heir of a great moral estate, and to provide an inventory of its treasure". Mills also stated that chivalry was a social, not a military phenomenon, with its key features: generosity, fidelity, liberality, and courtesy.

Europe before 1170: the noble habitus 
According to Crouch, prior to codified chivalry there was the uncodified code of noble conduct that focused on the preudomme, which can be translated as a wise, honest, and sensible man. This uncodified code – referred to as the noble habitus – is a term for the environment of behavioural and material expectations generated by all societies and classes. As a modern idea, it was pioneered by the French philosopher/sociologists Pierre Bourdieu and Maurice Merleau-Ponty, even though a precedent exists for the concept as far back as the works of Aristotle. Crouch argues that the habitus on which "the superstructure of chivalry" was built and the preudomme was a part, had existed long before 1100, while the codified medieval noble conduct only began between 1170 and 1220.

The pre-chivalric noble habitus as discovered by Mills and Gautier are as follows:
 Loyalty: It is a practical utility in a warrior nobility. Richard Kaeuper associates loyalty with prowess. The importance of reputation for loyalty in noble conduct is demonstrated in William Marshal biography.
 Forbearance: knights' self-control towards other warriors and at the courts of their lords was a part of the early noble habitus as shown in the Conventum of Hugh de Lusignan in the 1020s. The nobility of mercy and forbearance was well established by the second half of the 12th century long before there was any code of chivalry.
 Hardihood: Historians and social anthropologists have documented the fact physical resilience and aptitude in warfare in the earliest formative period of "proto-chivalry," was, to contemporary warriors, almost essential of chivalry-defined knighthood (saving the implicit Christian-Davidic ethical framework) and for a warrior of any origin, even the lowliest, to demonstrate outstanding physicality-based prowess on the battlefield was seen as near certainty of noble-knightly status or grounds for immediate nobilitation. To deliver a powerful blow in Arthurian literature almost always certifies of the warrior's nobility. Formal chivalric authorities and commentators were hardly in dispute: the anonymous author of La vraye noblesse, states if the prince or civic authority incarnate sees a man of "low degree" but of noble (i.e., martially imposing in the medieval context) bearing, he should promote him to nobility "even though he be not rich or of noble lineage": the "poor companion" who distinguishes themselves in worldly, incarnadine valor should be "publicly rewarded." As the erudite scholastic analyst modernly viewing these matters, Richard Kaeuper summarizes the matter: "A knight's nobility or worth is proved by his hearty strokes in battle" (Chivalry and Violence in Medieval Europe, p. 131). The quality of sheer hardihood aligns itself with forbearance and loyalty in being one of the military virtues of the preudomme. According to Philip de Navarra, a mature nobleman should have acquired hardiness as part of his moral virtues. Geoffrey de Charny also stressed on the masculine respectability of hardiness in the light of religious feeling of the contemptus mundi.
 Largesse or Liberality: generosity was part of a noble quantity. According to Alan of Lille, largesse was not just a simple matter of giving away what he had, but "Largitas in a man caused him to set no store on greed or gifts, and to have nothing but contempt for bribes."
 The Davidic ethic: It is the strongest qualities of preudomme derived by clerics from Biblical tradition. The classical-Aristotelian concept of the "magnanimous personality" in the conceptual formulation of the notion here is not without relevance, additionally, nor likewise the early-Germanic and Norse tradition of the war-band leader as the heroic, anti-materialistic "enemy of gold". Formally, the Christian-Davidic guardian-protector role concept of warrior-leadership was extensively articulated initially by the Frankish church which involved legitimizing rightful authority, first and foremost, on the basis of any would-be warrior-headman being ethically committed to the protection of the weak and helpless (pointedly, the Church and affiliated organizations are here implied primarily if not exclusively), respect and provisioning of justice for widows and orphans, and a Christian idealism-inspired, no-nonsense, principle-based militant opposition to the encroachments of overweening cruel and unjust personages wielding power, whether in the form of unruly, "black knight" or "robber-baron"-like local sub-princely magistrates, or even in the context of conceiving the hypothetical overthrow of a monarch who had usurped and violated the lex primordialis or lex naturae of God in his domain by decreeing or permitting immoral customs or laws and thus self-dethroning themselves meta-ethically, inviting tyrannicidal treatment. The core of Davidic ethic is benevolence of the strong toward the weak. Although a somewhat later authority in this specific context, John of Salisbury imbibed this lineage of philosophico-clerical, chivalric justifications of power, and excellently describes the ideal enforcer of the Davidic ethic here: "The [warrior-]prince accordingly is the minister of the common interest and the bond-servant of equity, and he bears the public person in the sense that he punishes the wrongs and injuries of all, and all crimes, with even-handed equity. His rod and staff also, administered with wise moderation, restore irregularities and false departures to the straight path of equity, so that deservedly may the Spirit congratulate the power of the prince with the words, 'Thy rod and thy staff, they have comforted me.' [Psalm 23:4] His shield, too, is strong, but it is a shield for the protection of the weak, and one which wards off powerfully the darts of the wicked from the innocent. Those who derive the greatest advantage from his performance of the duties of his office are those who can do least for themselves, and his power is chiefly exercised against those who desire to do harm. Therefore not without reason he bears a sword, wherewith he sheds blood blamelessly, without becoming thereby a man of blood, and frequently puts men to death without incurring the name or guilt of homicide."
 Honour: honour was what was achieved by living up to the ideal of the preudomme and pursuing the qualities and behaviour listed above. Maurice Keen notes the most damning, irreversible mode of "demoting" one's honorific status, again humanly through contemporary eyes, consisted in displaying pusillanimous conduct on the battlefield. The loss of honour is a humiliation to a man's standing and is worse than death. Bertran de Born said: "For myself I prefer to hold a little piece of land in onor, than to hold a great empire with dishonor".

From the 12th century onward chivalry came to be understood as a moral, religious and social code of knightly conduct. The particulars of the code varied, but codes would emphasise the virtues of courage, honour, and service. Chivalry also came to refer to an idealisation of the life and manners of the knight at home in his castle and with his court. The code of chivalry, as it was known during the late Medieval age, developed between 1170 and 1220.

Themes of chivalric literature
When examining medieval literature, chivalry can be classified into three basic but overlapping areas:
Duties to countrymen and fellow Christians: this contains virtues such as mercy, courage, valour, fairness, protection of the weak and the poor, and in the servant-hood of the knight to his lord. This also brings with it the idea of being willing to give one's life for another's; whether he would be giving his life for a poor man or his lord.
Duties to God: this would contain being faithful to God, protecting the innocent, being faithful to the church, being the champion of good against evil, being generous and obeying God above the feudal lord.
Duties to women: this is probably the most familiar aspect of chivalry. This would contain what is often called courtly love, the idea that the knight is to serve a lady, and after her all other ladies. Most especially in this category is a general gentleness and graciousness to all women.

Different weight given to different areas produced different strands of chivalry:
warrior chivalry, in which a knight's chief duty is to his lord, as exemplified by Sir Gawain in Sir Gawain and the Green Knight and The Wedding of Sir Gawain and Dame Ragnelle;
religious chivalry, in which a knight's chief duty is to protect the innocent and serve God, as exemplified by Sir Galahad or Sir Percival in the Grail legends;
courtly love chivalry, in which a knight's chief duty is to his own lady, and after her, all ladies, as exemplified by Sir Lancelot in his love for Queen Guinevere or Sir Tristan in his love for Iseult.

Origins in military ethos

Chivalry was developed in the north of France around the mid-12th century but adopted its structure in a European context. New social status, new military techniques, and new literary topics adhered to a new character known as the knight and his ethos called chivalry. A regulation in the chivalric codes includes taking an oath of loyalty to the overlord and perceiving the rules of warfare, which includes never striking a defenceless opponent in battle, and as far as resembling any perceived codified law, revolved around making the effort in combat wherever possible to take a fellow noble prisoner, for later ransom, rather than simply dispatching one another. The chivalric ideals are based on those of the early medieval warrior class, and martial exercise and military virtue remains an integral part of chivalry until the end of the medieval period, as the reality on the battlefield changed with the development of Early Modern warfare, and increasingly restricted it to the tournament ground and duelling culture. The joust remained the primary example of knightly display of martial skill throughout the Renaissance (the last Elizabethan Accession Day tilt was held in 1602).

The martial skills of the knight carried over to the practice of the hunt, and hunting expertise became an important aspect of courtly life in the later medieval period (see terms of venery).  Related to chivalry was the practice of heraldry and its elaborate rules of displaying coats of arms as it emerged in the High Middle Ages.

Chivalry and Christianity

Christianity and church had a modifying influence on the classical concept of heroism and virtue, nowadays identified with the virtues of chivalry. The Peace and Truce of God in the 10th century was one such example, with limits placed on knights to protect and honour the weaker members of society and also help the church maintain peace. At the same time the church became more tolerant of war in the defence of faith, espousing theories of the just war; and liturgies were introduced which blessed a knight's sword, and a bath of chivalric purification. In the story of the Grail romances and Chevalier au Cygne, it was the confidence of the Christian knighthood that its way of life was to please God, and chivalry was an order of God. Thus, chivalry as a Christian vocation was a result of marriage between Teutonic heroic values with the militant tradition of Old Testament.

The first noted support for chivalric vocation, or the establishment of knightly class to ensure the sanctity and legitimacy of Christianity, was written in 930 by Odo, abbot of Cluny, in the Vita of St. Gerald of Aurillac, which argued that the sanctity of Christ and Christian doctrine can be demonstrated through the legitimate unsheathing of the "sword against the enemy". In the 11th century the concept of a "knight of Christ" (miles Christi) gained currency in France, Spain and Italy. These concepts of "religious chivalry" were further elaborated in the era of the Crusades, with the Crusades themselves often being seen as a chivalrous enterprise. The military orders of the crusades which developed in this period came to be seen as the earliest flowering of chivalry, and some of their opponents like Saladin were likewise depicted as chivalrous adversaries. It remains unclear to what extent the notable military figures of this period—such as Saladin, Godfrey of Bouillon, William Marshal or Bertrand du Guesclin—actually did set new standards of knightly behaviour, or to what extent they merely behaved according to existing models of conduct which came in retrospect to be interpreted along the lines of the "chivalry" ideal of the Late Middle Ages. Nevertheless, chivalry and crusades were not the same thing. While the crusading ideology had largely influenced the ethic of chivalry during its formative times, chivalry itself was related to a whole range of martial activities and aristocratic values which had no necessary linkage with crusading.

The Virgin Mary was venerated by multiple chivalric orders, including the Teutonic Knights, who honored her as their patroness. The medieval development of chivalry, with the concept of the honour of a lady and the ensuing knightly devotion to it, not only derived from the thinking about Mary, but also contributed to it. Although women were at times viewed as the source of evil, it was Mary who as mediator to God was a source of refuge for man. The development of medieval Mariology and the changing attitudes towards women paralleled each other and can best be understood in a common context.

Influence of the Moors and Romans
The works of Roman poets like Ovid and Cicero bore some similarities to the typical depiction of romance in chivalric literature during the Middle Ages. In Ovid's works, lovers "became sleepless, grew pale, and lost their appetite," while Cicero's works celebrated the "ennobling power of love". Some scholars also point to the romantic poetry of Arabs and Persians as antecedents to the depiction of courtly love in medieval European literature. In the works of the Cordoban author Ibn Hazm, for example, "lovers develop passions for slave boys as well as girls, interchangeably, and the slave is recognized as now the master of his beloved." Ibn Hazm's The Ring of the Dove is a noteworthy depiction of a lover's extreme submissiveness.

Medieval courtly literature glorifies the valour, tactics, and ideals of both Moors and ancient Romans. For example, the ancient hand-book of warfare written by Vegetius called De re militari was translated into French in the 13th century as L'Art de chevalerie by Jean de Meun. Later writers also drew from Vegetius, such as Honoré Bonet, who wrote the 14th century L'Arbes des batailles, which discussed the morals and laws of war. In the 15th century Christine de Pizan combined themes from Vegetius, Bonet, and Frontinus in Livre des faits d'armes et de chevalerie.

Late Middle Ages
In the 14th century Jean Froissart wrote his Chronicles which captured much of the Hundred Years' War, including the Battle of Crécy and later the Battle of Poitiers both of which saw the defeat of the French nobility by armies made up largely of common men using longbows. The chivalric tactic employed by the French armoured nobility, namely bravely charging the opposition in the face of a hail of arrows, failed repeatedly. Froissart noted the subsequent attacks by common English and Welsh archers upon the fallen French knights. 

His Chronicles also captured a series of uprisings by common people against the nobility, such as the Jacquerie and The Peasant's Revolt and the rise of the common man to leadership ranks within armies. Many of these men were promoted during the Hundred Years' War but were later left in France when the English nobles returned home, and became mercenaries in the Free Companies, for example John Hawkwood, the mercenary leader of The White Company. The rise of effective, paid soldiery replaced noble soldiery during this period, leading to a new class of military leader without any adherence to the chivalric code. 

Chivalry underwent a revival and elaboration of chivalric ceremonial and rules of etiquette in the 14th century that was examined by Johan Huizinga, in The Waning of the Middle Ages, in which he dedicates a full chapter to "The idea of chivalry". In contrasting the literary standards of chivalry with the actual warfare of the age, the historian finds the imitation of an ideal past illusory; in an aristocratic culture such as Burgundy and France at the close of the Middle Ages, "to be representative of true culture means to produce by conduct, by customs, by manners, by costume, by deportment, the illusion of a heroic being, full of dignity and honour, of wisdom, and, at all events, of courtesy. ...The dream of past perfection ennobles life and its forms, fills them with beauty and fashions them anew as forms of art".

In the later Middle Ages, wealthy merchants strove to adopt chivalric attitudes. The sons of the bourgeoisie were educated at aristocratic courts, where they were trained in the manners of the knightly class. This was a democratisation of chivalry, leading to a new genre called the courtesy book, which were guides to the behaviour of "gentlemen". Thus, the post-medieval gentlemanly code of the value of a man's honour, respect for women, and a concern for those less fortunate, is directly derived from earlier ideals of chivalry and historical forces which created it.

Japan was the only country that banned the use of firearms completely to maintain ideals of chivalry and acceptable form of combat. In 1543 Japan established a government monopoly on firearms. The Japanese government destroyed firearms and enforced a preference for traditional Japanese weapons.

The end of chivalry
Chivalry was dynamic and it transformed and adjusted in response to local situations and this is what probably led to its demise. There were many chivalric groups in England as imagined by Sir Thomas Malory when he wrote Le Morte d'Arthur in the late 15th century; perhaps each group created each chivalric ideology. And Malory's perspective reflects the condition of 15th-century chivalry. When Le Morte d'Arthur was printed, William Caxton urged knights to read the romance with an expectation that reading about chivalry could unite a community of knights already divided by the Wars of the Roses.

During the early Tudor rule in England, some knights still fought according to the ethos. Fewer knights were engaged in active warfare because battlefields during this century were generally the area of professional infantrymen, with less opportunity for knights to show chivalry. It was the beginning of the demise of the knight. The rank of knight never faded, but it was Queen Elizabeth I who ended the tradition that any knight could create another and made it exclusively the preserve of the monarch. Christopher Wilkins contends that Sir Edward Woodville, who rode from battle to battle across Europe and died in 1488 in Brittany, was the last knight errant who witnessed the fall of the Age of Chivalry and the rise of modern European warfare. When the Middle Ages were over, the code of chivalry was gone.

Modern manifestations and revivals

Chivalry! – why, maiden, she is the nurse of pure and high affection – the stay of the oppressed, the redresser of grievances, the curb of the power of the tyrant – Nobility were but an empty name without her, and liberty finds the best protection in her lance and her sword.—Walter Scott, Ivanhoe (1820)

The chivalric ideal persisted into the early modern and modern period. The custom of foundation of chivalric orders by Europe's monarchs and high nobility peaked in the late medieval period, but it persisted during the Renaissance and well into the Baroque and early modern period, with e.g. the Tuscan Order of Saint Stephen (1561), the French Order of Saint Louis (1693) or the Anglo-Irish Order of St. Patrick (1783), and numerous dynastic orders of knighthood remain active in countries that retain a tradition of monarchy.

At the same time, with the change of courtly ideas during the Baroque period, the ideals of chivalry began to be seen as dated, or "medieval". Don Quixote, published in 1605–15, burlesqued the medieval chivalric novel or romance by ridiculing the stubborn adherence to the chivalric code in the face of the then-modern world as anachronistic, giving rise to the term Quixotism. Conversely, elements of Romanticism sought to revive such "medieval" ideals or aesthetics in the late 18th and early 19th century.

The behavioural code of military officers down to the Napoleonic era, the American Civil War (especially as idealised in the "Lost Cause" movement), and to some extent even to World War I, was still strongly modelled on the historical ideals, resulting in a pronounced duelling culture, which in some parts of Europe also held sway over the civilian life of the upper classes. With the decline of the Ottoman Empire, however, the military threat from the "infidel" disappeared. The European wars of religion spanned much of the early modern period and consisted of infighting between factions of various Christian denominations. This process of confessionalization ultimately gave rise to a new military ethos based in nationalism rather than "defending the faith against the infidel".

Social commentators of the Victorian era advocated for a revival of chivalry in order to remedy the ill effects of the Industrial Revolution. Thomas Carlyle's "Captains of Industry" were to lead a "Chivalry of Labour", a beneficent form of governance that is hierarchical yet fraternal in nature, rather than materialistic. John Ruskin's "Ideal Commonwealth" took chivalry as one of its basic characteristics.

In the American South in mid-19th century, John C. Breckinridge of Kentucky was hailed as the epitome of chivalry. He enjoyed a reputation for dignity and integrity, and especially his tall, graceful and handsome appearance, with piercing blue eyes and noble -looking expression, with cordial manner,  pleasing voice and eloquent address that was highly appreciated by voters, soldiers, and women alike. Such a bearing and demeanor was of course a facade, a fabrication that distracted from the reality that the antebellum South was a racist hierarchy, with enslaved blacks on the bottom, and on the next rung, the working-class whites who helped to control black people, both before and after the Civil War.

From the early modern period, the term gallantry (from galant, the Baroque ideal of refined elegance) rather than chivalry became used for the proper behaviour and acting of upper-class men towards upper-class women. In the 19th century, there were attempts to revive chivalry for the purposes of the gentleman of that time. Kenelm Henry Digby wrote his The Broad-Stone of Honour for this purpose, offering the definition: 'Chivalry is only a name for that general spirit or state of mind which disposes men to heroic actions, and keeps them conversant with all that is beautiful and sublime in the intellectual and moral world'.

The pronouncedly masculine virtues of chivalry came under attack on the parts of the upper-class suffragettes campaigning for gender equality in the early 20th century, and with the decline of the military ideals of duelling culture and of European aristocracies in general following the catastrophe of World War I, the ideals of chivalry became widely seen as outmoded by the mid-20th century.  As a material reflection of this process, the dress sword lost its position as an indispensable part of a gentleman's wardrobe, a development described as an "archaeological terminus" by Ewart Oakeshott, as it concluded the long period during which the sword had been a visible attribute of the free man, beginning as early as three millennia ago with the Bronze Age sword.

During the 20th century, the chivalrous ideal of protecting women came to be seen as a trope of melodrama ("damsel in distress"). The term chivalry retains a certain currency in sociology, in reference to the general tendency of men, and of society in general, to lend more attention offering protection from harm to women than to men, or in noting gender gaps in life expectancy, health, etc., also expressed in media bias giving significantly more attention to female than to male victims.

Formed in 1907, the world's first Scout camp, the Brownsea Island Scout camp, began as a boys' camping event on Brownsea Island in Poole Harbour, southern England, organised by British Army Lieutenant-General Robert Baden-Powell to test his ideas for the book Scouting for Boys. Boy scouts from different social backgrounds in the UK participated from 1 to 8 August 1907 in activities around camping, observation, woodcraft, chivalry, lifesaving and patriotism.

According to William Manchester, General Douglas MacArthur was a chivalric warrior who fought a war with the intention to conquer the enemy, completely eliminating their ability to strike back, then treated them with the understanding and kindness due their honour and courage. One prominent model of his chivalrous conduct was in World War II and his treatment of the Japanese at the end of the war. MacArthur's model provides a way to win a war with as few casualties as possible and how to get the respect of the former enemy after the occupation of their homeland. On May 12, 1962, MacArthur gave a famous speech in front of the cadets of United States Military Academy at West Point by referring to a great moral code, the code of conduct and chivalry, when emphasizing duty, honour, and country.

Criticism of chivalry 
Miguel de Cervantes, in Part I of Don Quixote (1605), attacks chivalric literature as historically inaccurate and therefore harmful (see history of the novel), though 
he was quite in agreement with many so-called chivalric principles and guides to behavior. He toyed with but never intended to write a chivalric romance that was historically truthful.

In a short story published in 1899, "The Passing of Grandison,"  African American writer Charles W. Chesnutt lampooned the pretensions of Southern U.S. chivalry, including its adherents' obsequious admiration for those above them on an imaginary social ladder, their  pedestaling of white womanhood and the anachronistic expectation that men perform knightly duties to earn a woman's hand in marriage, and most centrally, their blindness to the reality of perceptive acuity among those whom they considered hopelessly unintelligent, i.e., the enslaved.

Peter Wright criticizes the tendency to produce singular descriptions of chivalry, claiming there are many variations or "chivalries". Among the different chivalries Wright includes "military chivalry" complete with its code of conduct and proper contexts, and woman-directed "romantic chivalry" complete with its code of conduct and proper contexts, among others.

See also

 The Book of the Courtier
 Domnei
 Habitus (sociology)
 High Court of Chivalry
 Honor
 Knight-errant
 Military elite
 Nine Noble Virtues
 Nine Worthies
 Noblesse oblige
 Pas d'Armes
 Seven virtues
 Spanish chivalry
 Virtue
 Warrior code
 Wiccan Rede
 Women and children first

Cross-cultural comparisons

 Ayyaran
 Futuwwa
 Bushido
 Chinese knight-errant
 Emi Omo Eso
 Eso Ikoyi
 Furusiyya
 Junzi
 Maharlika
 Pashtunwali
 Samurai
 Timawa

Notes

References

Citations

Bibliography

Further reading
 Alexander, Michael. (2007) Medievalism: The Middle Ages in Modern England, Yale University Press. Alexander rejects the idea that medievalism, a pervasive cultural movement in the nineteenth and early twentieth centuries, was confined to the Victorian period and argues against the suspicion that it was by its nature escapist.
 
 Barber, Richard (1980). "The Reign of Chivalry".
 Bouchard, Constance Brittain (1998). Strong of Body, Brave and Noble: Chivalry and Society in Medieval France. Cornell University Press, 1998. 
 Charny, Geoffroi de, died 1356 (2005). A Knight's Own Book of Chivalry (The Middle Ages Series). Translated by Elspeth Kennedy. Edited and with a historical introduction by Richard W. Kaeuper. University of Pennsylvania Press. Celebrated treatise on knighthood by Geoffroi de Charny (1304?-56), considered by his contemporaries the quintessential knight of his age. He was killed during the Hundred Years War at the Battle of Poitiers.
 Crouch, David (2019). The Chivalric Turn: Conduct and Hegemony in Europe before 1300. Oxford University Press
 Girouard, Mark (1981). The Return to Camelot: Chivalry and the English Gentleman. Yale University Press.
 Jones, Robert W. and Peter Coss, eds. A Companion to Chivalry (Boydell Press, 2019). 400 pp.  online review
 Kaeuper, Richard W. (1999). Chivalry and Violence in Medieval Europe. Oxford University Press, 1999.
 Kaeuper, Richard W. (2009). Holy Warriors: The Religious Ideology of Chivalry. The Middle Ages Series. University of Pennsylvania Press. Foremost scholar of chivalry argues that knights proclaimed the validity of their bloody profession by selectively appropriating religious ideals. 
 Keen, Maurice (1984). Chivalry. Yale University Press.  /  (2005 reprint).
 Saul, Nigel (2011). Chivalry in Medieval England. Harvard University Press. Explores chivalry's role in English history from the Norman Conquest to Henry VII's victory at Bosworth in the War of the Roses.

External links
 Wright, Peter. "Bastardized Chivalry: From Concern for Weakness to Sexual Exploitation." New Male Studies, ISSN 1839-7816 ~ Vol 7 Issue 2, pp. 43–59, (2018)
 Laura Ashe (University of Oxford), Miri Rubin (University of London), and Matthew Strickland (University of Glasgow), interviewed by Melvin Bragg, "Chivalry", In Our Time, BBC Radio 4 (February 13, 2014). Includes bibliography for further reading. Downloadable podcast available.
 Charles Moeller (1908). "Chivalry". In Catholic Encyclopedia. 3. New York: Robert Appleton Company.
 "Chivalry", Encyclopædia Britannica, full-article, newest edition.
 "Chivalry during the Reign of Edward III", from Shadow Realms.
 
 
 The Art of Chivalry : European arms and armor from the Metropolitan Museum of Art : an exhibition, Issued in connection with a 1982 exhibition at The Metropolitan Museum of Art